This is a list of Empowered characters.

Main characters

Empowered

Empowered is a female member of the Superhomeys superhero group and the titular character of the Empowered graphic novel series. Empowered's civilian name is Elissa Megan Powers, but is most commonly referred to by her fellow heroes and friends as “Emp”.  Whether this is purely because of it being a shortened reference to her superhero name, or simply a phonetic pronunciation of her civilian name initials is not specified.

Emp is a 20-something super heroine and associate-member of the Superhomeys superhero group.  Her powers and abilities are derived from a super suit of unknown origin and nature (the suit literally "fell out of the sky" in an envelope addressed to her).  This suit, while being Emp’s source of power, has also made her a social laughingstock as it often fails her when she needs it the most.  This is due to the suit’s material, known as a “hyper membrane”, being incredibly thin and incredibly skin-tight, while also being extremely fragile and sometimes uncooperative.

Despite these shortcomings, Empowered’s super suit has steadily become more useful and resilient with new abilities being revealed as the series progresses.  Additionally, Emp’s suit has been implied to have been bonded specifically to her, and has been shown to be completely useless when worn by other people. The suit's odd behaviour and contradictory properties (such as being able to stop bullets and shark bites, yet also extremely fragile) are at least partially a result of Elissa's psychological difficulties and limitations.

Emp’s super suit imparts both voluntary powers, controlled intentionally by the wearer, and involuntary powers; passive abilities that become active without conscious intent of the wearer, and physical attributes that do not necessarily enhance the function of the suit but are active nonetheless.

Voluntary Abilities of Empowered’s Super suit

Superhuman strength. Emp herself describes her physical strength, while the suit is undamaged, as approximating that of 10 fit men.

Invisibility. This ability is purely voluntary, but the invisibility effect does not extend to the wearer, essentially making Emp appear nude whenever she tries to use it. It is also possible for Emp to make sections of the suit turn invisible while other sections remain visible. This ability was advantageous for her to trick dWARf/Fleshmaster into allowing her into the back-stage control room from which he was sabotaging the proceedings of the Caped Justice Awards ceremony.

Various visual enhancements including magnification and x-ray vision. These visual enhancements remain usable even if the suit has been damaged to the point that all other voluntary powers have ceased functioning. She can also access a mecha’s software cognisphere to read and manipulate interface menus, sometimes even when they’re in alien languages. 

The ability to cling to all surfaces. Emp discovered this power accidentally when she was flung to the underside of the outstretched hand of a large statue. This may be a form of dispersive adhesion.

High-intensity directed energy discharges. Emp has marginal control of these energy blasts, and varying ability to aim them. She has improved in this area as the series has progressed, but this has not deterred the foes that she faces, nor does it seem to discourage the frequency by which Emp is captured. However, her ability to use this power became markedly more accurate when Thugboy was in danger of death. Also, there may be a secondary, and far more powerful "mode" to this ability that manifests itself without Emp's awareness.

Fragments of the hyper membrane seem to obey the wishes of Emp, even after being torn away from the main body of the suit. This was demonstrated when Emp nearly killed a villain called Lone Gunman. She used a large portion of her suit’s material to block Lone Gunman’s air passages, but managed to coax the material into pulling out of his mouth and nose with a verbal request.

The suit can place phone calls when the wearer makes a telephone hand-sign. The voluntary abilities of Emp’s suit are usually lost when too much of the suit’s fragile material is ripped away. Despite this often-exploited drawback, Empowered’s suit also has many abilities that are not directly controlled, and usually remain functional.

Automatic functions

Damage Protection. The suit is able to absorb or deflect all damage that may be directed at it while leaving Emp unharmed. This has been demonstrated with gunfire, various bladed weapons, blunt impacts, and even a shark bite. Although, this usually leaves the suit itself greatly damaged, Emp has never been subject to bodily harm in the process, with a single exception during a confrontation with a mind-controlled Ninjette wielding a magic katana, who was able to wound her.

Suit Regeneration. The suit is capable of self-repair, however, very slowly. This appears to somehow be tied to Emp’s sexual activity, or possibly her emotional state. and it has been implied that Emp has become something of a sexual deviant since she began using the suit.

Vacuum Support. The suit can protect Empowered while exposed to outer space, seemingly keeping her body pressurized, protected from extreme temperatures, shielded from ambient radiation, and allowing her to breathe as if in normal atmosphere. This can happen despite the suit being damaged in several places, exposing Emp’s bare skin.

Powered-up Independent Action. The suit can manifest structures somewhat resembling the skeleton of a bat's wings, enabling Emp to hover. At the same time, when manifesting this "skeletal" wings, the suit can shoot wide-radius energy blasts that are incredibly more powerful and damaging that Emp's normal discharges. Emp is unaware of this ability, as the suit apparently was mind-controlling her the only time it was used.

In addition to voluntary and involuntary abilities, the suit also has some functions and attributes that are active regardless of the person interacting with the material of the hyper membrane.

The suit can “knit” itself around the hair follicles on Empowered’s scalp, giving the appearance that the cowl of the suit is really an accessory mask. This may be one of the only abilities of the suit that is not reliant on Emp being the user as this occurred with a male wearer of the suit who stole it from Emp in an attempt to gain the suit’s powers.

The suit can greatly accentuate the sensations from sexual stimulation. It is not clear if this effect can be experienced by anyone, as long as Emp is involved, or if this is another example of the suit having a passive effect on anybody.

The suit sometimes acts autonomously, taking on the physical dimensions of Emp without her actually wearing it. The only character shown to interact with the suit while it does this is the extraterrestrial/supernatural energy being/symbiote that is trapped within alien bondage gear commonly referred to as “The Caged Demonwolf”.

Because Empowered is only an associate member of the Superhomeys, her participation with the group is limited in scope and something akin to “part-time”, so she still has a day job.  Her first day job consisted of wearing a mascot costume for a discount retail store called “Value Mammoth”, advertising the store’s sales with a picket sign.  This job earned her much disrespect and derision from passersby.  Eventually, Emp lost this job when she accidentally destroyed the store in an attempt to defeat a massive Ammonoidea-like monster as it rampaged through the city.

For an interminable period, it is implied that Emp took a job at a restaurant known as P.J. McJiggles, Food and Hotness.

Afterward, Emp moved on to cosplaying as her costumed self in a licensed troupe of Superhomeys imitators known as “The Superhomeys Experience”.  In this impersonation of herself, she wears a PVC imitation of her hyper membrane supersuit. During her performances, she affects a comically heavy Southern accent in order to encourage onlookers to not recognize her as being the actual Empowered.  In this she was successful until she was forced to reveal herself when the troupe was abducted by Anglerfish in an attempt to force the Superhomeys to investigate Willy Pete.

Emp is in a heavily sexual relationship with her Japanese-American boyfriend, only referred to as “Thugboy”.  Previous to meeting Emp, Thugboy spent the majority of his adult career as a henchperson to many different supervillains. However, after meeting Emp, he has given up his life of criminal-assistance to largely act as emotional and physical support for Emp as she struggles with her insecurities. This support frequently manifests in the form of sex, which may be beneficial to Emp’s suit as well as her emotional state since the former seems to mirror the latter.

Emp's relationships with other superheroes and the general public are complex: despite the Superhomeys generally having nothing but contempt and pity, if not outright mockery for her long list of shortcomings (exacerbated, after the Willy Pete fiasco, by the outright hatred and blame Major Havoc keeps pouring on her for the death of his friends), it's implied Empowered has appeal on the large public.

It's in fact implied by Maid Man that while the other superheroes are often seen as cold, aloof and self-aggrandizing superpowered beings oblivious to the damages they bring around, and detached from humanity, Empowered bridges the gap by blatantly showing her human failures and shortcomings. However, while Empowered may be liked as a person, as a superheroine she is still considered somewhat of a trashy oddball, whose feminine physique is the only credit to her career.

Thugboy

Thugboy (first name: Noah) is a male former-career criminal, boyfriend of Emp, and the remaining member of the former Witless Minions. So far, Thugboy’s full name has not been revealed, and no other characters have been shown to ask him about this.  Although Thugboy had previously been a career criminal, he quickly gave up his life of crime to become somewhat of a protector and primary supporter of Emp in her efforts to become a worthwhile superhero.

Before meeting Emp, Thugboy was the nominal leader of the Witless Minions, a gang of comrades that made a living through being hired by aspiring supervillains for the eventual purpose of bankrupting them by stealing their equipment and selling it for personal profit. He also briefly worked for a white supremacist supervillain named "Super Caucasian", but was swiftly fired for being half-Japanese. Eventually, this scheme went awry when they became employed by Willy Pete. Rather than driving Willy Pete into bankruptcy and forcing him to give up his schemes due to a lack of funding and support, it incensed Willy Pete so much that he decided to track down and kill every last member of the Witless Minions. In this, Willy Pete was nearly successful; after having sodomized every other Witless Minion, Willy Pete was temporarily incapacitated by being frozen. This afforded Thugboy the necessary time to escape.

Since the demise of the Witless Minions, and until he first met Emp, Thugboy lived his life with no regard for his own well being, often showing no fear in the face of imminent danger or death. However, upon meeting Emp, Thugboy became amorously obsessed and eventually gave up his career or misdeed to become Empowered's "White Knight". Since then, Emp and Thugboy's relationship has been implicitly sexual and emotionally supportive; sometimes, these two manifest as the same thing. Thugboy's admiration for Emp is so great that usually an entire chapter in every volume of the Empowered series is devoted to the various aspects of his enamor.

Despite Thugboy giving up his criminality, he still retains a love (and proficiency) for firearms.  So far in his post-minion lifestyle, he has been shown using a Barrett M82A1 .50 caliber sniper rifle, a Ruger SP-101, and a Ruger P series semi-automatic handgun.  During the Caped Justice Awards ceremony he also used Single Action's weapons.

Thugboy holds a dark secret from Emp that has been occasionally mentioned - "The San-Antonio incident".  Although not dealt with explicitly, it has been implied at various points throughout the comic run that Thugboy was involved in a Cape Killing militia - thus going against the unspoken rules that exist between Heroes and Villains in the Empowered universe. Empowered, in her capacity as the story narrator, explicitly acknowledges that in the introduction to volume 6, and in the same issue Thugboy, showing uneasiness in attending at the funeral services for the latest victims of Willy Pete, flashes back to himself planning a superhero massacre during a funeral in San Antonio, strongly implied to be the San Antonio Incident itself.

Kozue Kaburagi, aka Ninjette

Kozue Kaburagi, who is more commonly referred to as "Ninjette" or simply "'Jette", is a highly skilled ninja and princess of the Kaburagi ninja clan, based out of New Jersey. Although Ninjette is either a second or third-generation Japanese-American with a strongly Caucasoid appearance, her family name is intended to be traditionally Japanese.

Despite being a princess of the Kaburagi ninja clan, Ninjette ran away from her clan and has been in hiding for several years so as to avoid being forced into a life of servitude to the clan by continually giving birth to high-blooded clan members. She met Emp in the usual way - i.e., Emp getting captured once again -, but when her thugs failed to show up to collect her captive, the two women went into the next bar for a drinking rout and became fast friends. Kozue subsequently moved in with Emp and Thugboy and has been a close friend to both ever since.

Furthermore, while being more competent and skilled than Emp, Kozue carries even deeper insecurities than her friend, stemming by her apparent role of a breeding mare for her clan, and bolstered by the continued berating she suffered in her childhood for her presumed lack of skills in respect of her clansfolk. Until volume 4 and 5, when she was forced to openly confront the issue, she always kept herself on the brink of alcoholism, as a way to silence the voices in her head. As such, she also keeps using, in a comical way, her ninja skills to improve (apparently with a certain success) her self-image, having techniques for simulating a tipsy mindframe or give herself a sexy sway. In addition, she took emulating Elissa in her "civilian" life, reasoning that while as Ninjette she may look more charismatic and seductive than Empowered, as Kozue she believes Elissa more naturally beautiful than her. Through out the series, Ninjette has a growing sexual attraction towards Thug Boy, Emp's boyfriend, once when Thug boy had accidentally groped her in bed, mistaking her for Emp, she blushed, and another time when she made-out with a member of her clan, disguised as Thug Boy, despite knowing it wasn't him, she refuses to act on her feelings out of respect for her friend.

Heroes

Dr. Big McLarge Huge

Dr. Big McLarge Huge is a superhuman doctor at the Superhuman Wing of the Purple Paladin Memorial hospital.  Big McLarge Huge is named as such because of his massive stature and physique.  Although he is larger than most of the humanoid superheroes and villains in the Empowered series, his given profession is as a physician and surgeon, specializing in the treatment of critical wounds and maladies that seem to be common in the superhero profession. While Dr. McLarge Huge appears to be a dedicated physician, he is still upset that he has never been nominated for a Caped Justice award, and deems such injustice as a misplacement of priorities within the superhero community.

While in attendance of the Caped Justice Awards, and the subsequent sabotage of the ceremonies, Dr. Big McLarge Huge ingested some of the food that had been tainted with Wet Blanket’s flesh, the result of which reverted him to a much smaller form, indicating that his largeness is not a natural attribute.

Dr. Big McLarge Huge's name comes from a comment made during the Space Mutiny episode of Mystery Science Theater 3000.

Capitan Rivet

Capitan (sic) Rivet is the nominal leader of the super-powered crime fighters known as the “Superhomeys”.  Capitan Rivet’s attributes are largely unknown aside from some visual clues given in the various battles that the character has participated in.  In several instances Capitan Rivet appears to be a hollow suit of armor, as he has been rent in half, had parts of the armor pulled away, or been deeply dented without ill effect to the contents or user of the armor, however, a pair of glowing eyes is always visible through the eye-holes in the armored head of the suit.

Despite being considered a leader of the Superhomeys (as well as one of the few members who don't mock Empowered), he is sometimes ineffectual in enforcing rules of conduct in the group’s members.  As a result, the group is prone to cattiness and openly ostracizes Empowered and other “associate members” of the group.

Capitan Rivet has also been accused of having been involved in the Kennedy assassination, in a malicious Wikipedia edit.

Captain Katana

Captain Katana is a male human superhero whose limbs have been severed at the knees and elbows and replaced with Katanas on mechanical joints.  Additionally, he has a magical Katana running through the top of his head and, presumably, down his neck and spine.  Despite this, he normally suffers no ill effects or even pain.  The only exception to this came with the incident at the Caped Justice Awards, in which whatever was suppressing the pain of the magical sword running through his body was negated by the power-nullifying effects of the catered food that was tainted with the flesh of Wet Blanket.  Rendered powerless and in pain, Captain Katana suffered damage from the rampaging alien organs.

Despite this, he did survive the ordeal and was later killed in his participation in an attempt to ambush and defeat Willy Pete. After his death his gravestone is seen during Irresistimmovable attack on the Shambhala-like Suprahuman Mausoleum, along with several other dead suprahumans.

Divangelic

Divangelic is a pair of female entities; a demon named Vanity and an angel named Charity of nearly identical appearance who are conjoined at the shoulder.  They are members of the Superhomeys superhero group.  Divangelic, in following their biblical theme, is capable of flight through use of one feathery stereotypically angelic wing and one bat-like demon wing.  The two entities of Divangelic also wield weapons individually; Vanity, a bullwhip with a sort of energy cracker, and Charity with a type of smooth headed Morning Star with glowing energy ports instead of spikes. Divangelic was killed in their participation in the Superhomeys' failed attempt to ambush Willy Pete.

dWARf!

dWARf! is a senior member of the Superhomeys superhero group.  Not much is known about his powers or skills due to him being rarely shown in battle, except for one instance when the Superhomeys were attacked by a group of pirate-themed technology developers known as "A.R.R.,” or "Advanced Restraint Research.” He likely possesses superhuman strength, as he was shown to be able to carry a container larger than himself above his head without apparent difficulty.

dWARf! was once another super-powered costumed hero known as “Fleshmaster.”  During his time as Fleshmaster, he was a highly unpopular associate-level hero with low-level gene-altering abilities.  His career as this persona ended shortly after his humiliation at the hands of his fellow heroes during the Caped Justice Awards ceremonies.

After the disappearance of Fleshmaster, dWARf! debuted and became popular amongst the senior members of the Superhomeys.  Despite his newfound popularity with this new persona, dWARf!/Fleshmaster decided to exact revenge against his former tormentors-turned-friends when he became aware of a plan to humiliate Emp in much the same manner that he had been.  In doing this he sabotaged the Caped Justice Awards ceremony by tainting the catered food with liquefied flesh from the former supervillain known as Wet Blanket.  The flesh of Wet Blanket, who exudes a superpower-nullifying effect from every cell, caused the majority of the attending heroes to temporarily lose their powers.  To this, he introduced a massive, autonomous, extraterrestrial kidney that filters waste with coherent light, and an even larger extraterrestrial “pseudo-liver” that was removed from a being because of an infestation of human-sized parasitic creatures.  dWARf!’s plot was found out and he was then defeated by Emp before any of the de-powered heroes were killed.  After his defeat at the hands of Emp, dWARf! was taken by the terminally ill and xenobiologically enhanced super-genius 11-year-old, Manny, in the hopes of using dWARf!’s gene-altering powers to devise a treatment for the cancer that is threatening his life.

Femifist

Femifist is a female, costumed, news reporter for the Hero Network.  She was the field reporter present at the Caped Justice Awards ceremony that was sabotaged by dWARf!.  Femifist's superhuman abilities or attributes, if any, have not been demonstrated, but she did mention a loss of “fisting power” when she was affected by the catered food at the awards ceremony that had been tainted with the flesh of Wet Blanket.

Heavy Artillery

Heavy Artillery is a male member of the Superhomeys superhero group.  Heavy Artillery appears to be a human who has, at some point, had his head and neck completely replaced with some sort of mounted artillery gun.

Heavy Artillery is also shown to be openly gay.

Homunculoid

Homunculoid is a posthuman male member of the Superhomeys superhero group.  Homunculoid's powers have not been explicitly defined, but he seems to possess enhanced senses, perhaps due to his enlarged facial features and oversized hands, which appear similar to a sensory homunculus figure, which represents the density of sensory nerves in parts of the body. In particular, when the Superhomeys attempted to ambush Willy Pete in his hideout he could tell the burn marks on the floor were fresh and was able to smell Willy Pete's presence before he actually appeared.

Through psychic insights revealed by the super heroine Mindfuck, Homunculoid was revealed to be a womanizer and had sexual interest in Ninjette.

Homunculoid was incinerated in the Superhomeys' attempt to capture Willy Pete.

Jugganaut

Jugganaut is a female, costumed heroine whose outfit intentionally draws attention to her large breasts.  Jugganaut was shown briefly being interviewed at the Caped Justice Awards.  Previous to that, she was referenced by Emp as an example of a female hero that tries to capitalize on her sexual appeal.

Makro
Makro is a female, costumed heroine wearing a slightly armored jumpsuit, and wielding some degree of superstrength and endurance, hosting the Superdirty Jobs show on the HeroNET. As such, she is tasked to find the heroes doing the less glamorous jobs, away from the limelight (from mere steel workers tasked with the manufacture of enhanced materials to hunters of exotic/alien species), telling of their exploits to the large public. Her name is a play on the name of Mike Rowe, the host of real-life TV show Dirty Jobs.

Mindfuck

Mindfuck is a female human member of the Superhomeys superhero group and possessor of very powerful psychic abilities.  Her abilities are so great that her primary mode of communication is through telepathy.  Although, this mode of communication is more of a necessity than a choice as, at some point in the past, she was psychically possessed by her brother and “puppeted” into cutting out her own tongue and eyes.  Despite this, she has managed to adapt through use of a cybernetic visor that affords her vision, and in cases where her visor has been damaged beyond use, she can “piggyback” others by tapping into their Sensorium.

Though Mindfuck is a very powerful psychic, gifted in telepathy as well as a form of telepresence of the mind's eye, she was not fully able to control or filter her perceptions when in large crowds.  As a result, Mindfuck took up residence aboard the Joint Superteam Space Station 3, colloquially referred to as “The D10” for its resemblance to a 10-sided die, to distance herself as much as possible from what she termed as the “babbleroar” on Earth as well as to take custodianship of the Lotus Portal Network.  Another consequence of her being forced to communicate telepathically, while being unable to filter her thought stream, was that she could not lie or be deceptive.  While she could read the unfiltered thought streams of others, it was still possible for her to be deceived by persons with some types of psychosis as well as individuals with strong delusions.

For some time, Mindfuck was in a pseudo-sexual relationship with Sistah Spooky.  This is despite Mindfuck’s physical appearance in approximating the “Aryan ideal of shoulder candy”; an attribute that Sistah Spooky identifies as her reasons for hating Emp.  Mindfuck and Sistah Spooky’s relationship mainly consisted of Mindfuck placating and assuring Sistah Spooky of her attractiveness and occasionally engaging in psychically facilitated metaphysical sexual intercourse.  Despite Mindfuck’s assurances that she truly loved Sistah Spooky, mentally as well as physically, Sistah Spooky broke off their relationship by asserting that Mindfuck shared some common attributes with her brother.

For the majority of Volume 5, Mindfuck became a friend and advisor to Emp, who had recently come under scrutiny from her Superhomey colleagues following the events of the Caped Justice Awards.  Mindfuck perished by the end of Volume 5 when the Joint Superteam Space Station, upon which she was the sole inhabitant, was destroyed by atmospheric immolation; the result of the Superhomeys underestimating Willy Pete in their attempt to ambush and defeat him.  After her death she receives a gravestone in the Shambhala-like Suprahuman Mausoleum, along with several other dead suprahumans.

Maid Man

Maid Man is a lone superhero who dresses and uses weapons thematically designed to imply he is a French Maid or housekeeper.  His personality, manner of speech, attitude towards crime, fighting style and weaponry, all spoof Batman.  This is repeatedly used for injokes (ie, when asked if a burly man like him doesn't feel ridiculous dressing in a flimsy French Maid costume, he replies that he would feel much more embarrassed dressing as an animal, like a bat).  Unlike the majority of superheroes in the Empowered series, Maid Man does not have any superhuman abilities.  Despite this, he is well liked within the milieu of superheroes and is extremely capable of defending himself and others against beings with superhuman abilities.  Maid Man is also one of the few heroes who treats Emp with respect and gives her salient advice.  Initially introduced as a minor/background character, he takes on a leading role alongside Emp and her other friends in Volume 6.

Emp first met Maid Man when he infiltrated the super-villain group known as the “Felonifive” under a false supervillain identity known as “Crowquet”.

As Maid Man had no actual superhuman powers to remove in the first place, he was one of the few unaffected heroes present at the Caped Justice Awards fiasco.

As shown in his first appearance in Vol 6, there is the possibility that Maid Man is a multiple personality disorder sufferer, and his civilian alter ego is unaware of the specifics of what happens when he switches over.

Major Havoc

A senior member of the Superhomeys superhero group, Major Havoc usually plays a large role in the various endeavors of the group. Because of his relative importance, Major Havoc is a braggart and somewhat of a simpleton. His standard attack phrase is "'Scuse me while I cry 'Havoc'!"

Major Havoc is a womanizer and is unapologetic about it.  On a few occasions, Major Havoc has used his seniority to exploit the Superhomeys resources and trick Emp into sexual situations, both public and private, so that he may gratify himself to the images.  Also, as Emp’s career as a superheroine has continued, Major Havoc has become more vocal in his disapproval of Emp’s abilities as a hero.  This culminated in him leading the other, more senior, members of the Superhomeys to become suspicious of Emp’s involvement in the Caped Justice Awards debacle.

Major Havoc’s powers are not specifically mentioned, although he appears to possess superhuman strength and a high level of invulnerability to physical damage.  Although his abilities have allowed him some degree of acclaim, these powers have not prevented him from being utterly defeated on at least a few occasions. His fighting ability has been described as “like a developmentally-disabled 3rd grader” by Ninjette, and indeed has been shown to consist of straightforward punches and strikes.

Major Havoc is one of the "one and a half" survivors of the Superhomey's botched attempt to ambush Willy Pete due to his relative proximity to Turbobrain and his telekinetic fire shield as well as his own physical resilience. In fact, while Turbobrain received horrifical burns on his whole body, Major Havoc came out largely unscathed, with burns on his legs and arms, caused by his attempts to carry the still burning Turbobrain to safety, blaming Empowered for their fate.

Mechzacouatl

Mechzacouatl is a large mechanized serpent with feathery wings, and a member of the Superhomeys superhero group. Mechzacouatl has been seen used as transportation on occasion. Although he has never been shown to speak, a one sided telephone conversation with Capitan Rivet demonstrates that he can. He is also said to be in a sexual relationship with Cybertiamat due to supervillain Soldier of Love’s influence.

Mechzacouatl’s name is a portmanteau of Mecha and a misspelling of Quetzalcoatl.

Ocelotina

Ocelotina is a female costumed performer who acts the part of a super heroine despite a complete lack of super powers, remarkable skills, or special technologies to support this appearance.  Rather, her status and popularity appears to stem almost entirely from her self-promotion through “how-to” videos of dubious content and product endorsements.

As is implied by her assumed pseudonym, Ocelotina’s theme is based upon the Ocelot.  Her costume features cat ears, clawed gloves, lingerie stockings, knee-high high heeled boots, a body appliqué that prominently exposes her cleavage through an opening shaped like a feline head, and false glowing “eyes” applied to the inner surface of her breasts to simulate cat eyes. She also affects feline sounds that she utters after some of her sentences.

In her earliest appearances in the Empowered series, before she had taken on her costumed persona, she had been taken hostage by a group of thugs.  Emp attempted to rescue her, but failed and was taken captive as well when she accidentally damaged her hyper membrane suit in an attempt at a dramatic entrance through a skylight window.  Later, the would-be Ocelotina staged another hostage taking of herself with the assistance of her brother.  This ruse was set as a trap for Emp as their plan was to ransom her back to the Superhomeys.  Sistah Spooky promptly foiled this plot, but not before Emp was almost completely denuded of her suit at the hands of the would-be Ocelotina as a measure to ensure it would not grow back too soon and provide her a means of escape.

Phallik

Phallik is a male member of the Superhomeys superhero group.  Although he was featured in every volume of the Empowered series, his status within the Superhomeys was never defined as either “Senior” or “Associate”, it was only during the 6th volume that it would be revealed he held a senior position, later defined as being the Superhomey's rep on the Joint Superteam Commission On Superdead Issues, the ambassador between the dead bargainers and the still alive heroes   Phallik's superpowers seemed to revolve solely around his mighty “Phallospear” he carried with him, and his powers did appear to be drained alongside other heroes that were affected by the tainted food at the Caped Justice Awards.  This loss of power manifested in his phallus-like weapon suddenly becoming limp.

Phallik was killed in his participation in the failed attempt by the Superhomeys to ambush and defeat Willy Pete. He was then revealed to be a bargainer, a superhero owing his powers to a bargain with a mystical, immortal being. As such, his charred corpse has sprung back to life, in a zombie-like fashion, dependant from his Phallospear to survive, getting into Deathmonger's service. Empowered posthumously wielded the Phallospear to free him, and the other bargainers, from eternal slavery, and later gained his role in the Superdead commission.

Protean

Protean is a posthuman member of the Superhomeys superhero group.  Protean is a semisolid mass of matter that has been rendered into his current state by the effects of an extraterrestrial STD.  Despite this change in his physiology, he has retained his intelligence and personality, and despite not having any distinguishable body parts besides hollow glowing “eyes”, he retains all of his normal senses and is even able to speak.  Previously, Protean’s given superhero pseudonym was “Glorpp”.  Despite his colleagues’ unwillingness to call him as such, and the frequency that it is misspoken as “protein”, he still tries to correct anybody that does not call him as such.

Protean’s method of combat is to overwhelm  his opponents with his body mass to restrict movement.

Although an extraterrestrial STD induced his current physiology, he does not appear to pass on this infectious agent through contact with his mass.

Purple Paladin

The Purple Paladin was a male hero that is greatly revered by the other characters within the Empowered series.  His exploits are not prominently mentioned, but whatever he had done, he is memorialized by having the city’s hospital named after him.

Q Girl

Q Girl is shown as an alliterative example when Emp complains about the drawbacks of her hyper membrane super suit not functioning properly if she wears a cape to cover her behind.  Q Girl is shown with a self-satisfied smile as her hero costume features a cape that neatly covers her own behind.

Red Griffon

Red Griffon is a male, costumed, hero that was only mentioned as a comparison to Emp’s bravado in her attempts at heroism.  Thugboy indicated that Red Griffon would probably not have as great a reputation if his armor were as fragile as the hyper-membrane suit that Emp wears.

Robotomy

Robotomy is a mechanical humanoid member of the Superhomeys superhero group.  Robotomy is an artificial being that appears to be capable of independent thought and actions.  Robotomoy’s gender, if any, is not revealed.  However, it is inferred that Robotomy is attracted to female humanoid buttocks, as it is seen commenting on the behinds of Emp as well as staring at the behind of Vanity, of Divangelic. Robotomy perished in the failed ambush of Willy Pete.

Scarlet Succubus

The Scarlet Succubus is a female, costumed heroine that has not been shown within the Empowered series thus far.  However, she was mentioned by Emp as an example of a female superhero that deliberately wears minimal clothing in an attempt to appear sexy.

Single Action

Single Action is a male member of the Superhomeys superhero group whose theme is reminiscent of the Old West.  He dresses in the manner of a traditional cowboy, complete with cowboy hat, boots, and riding chaps, as well as a pair of protective goggles.  His superhero moniker is derived from his trademark weapons; a pair of laser-pistols that resemble single-action Colt 1851 Navy Revolvers.  Although it is anachronistic, that he himself recognizes, to have laser pistols that require hand cocking of a hammer, he uses them because he thinks that they are “plumb cool”.

A beam of coherent light from the alien kidney that was used to sabotage the Caped Justice Awards injured Single Action, which rendered him unable to fight.  Fortunately, Thugboy, who had been accompanying Emp to the awards ceremony, was able to take up Single Action's weapons and assist in subduing the alien organs that were endangering the de-powered heroes.

Sistah Spooky

Sistah Spooky is a female member of the Superhomeys superhero group. Unlike the majority of other superheroes in the group, her powers are derived from supernatural demonic sources.  This was facilitated by a demon that had been providing preternatural augmentation of physical appearance to the girls in her high school in exchange for their immortal souls.  Then known as Theresa, Spooky was looked down upon for her appearance differing from the rest of the supernaturally idealized blondes that appeared to be the status quo of the school.  As a result of her social stigma in high school, Theresa was left emotionally damaged and bearing a deep, unreasoning hatred for all blondes - including her later teammate Emp.

Theresa performed a satanic ritual to call forth a demon to wreak vengeance against her tormentors. It turned out that this was the same demon that had been making pacts with the girls in her school and it tried to persuade her to make the deal herself.  Despite appearing to resist she was later shown transformed, but due to an apparent clerical error on the part of the demon (later revealed to have been entirely deliberate as part of a scheme to free itself), Theresa had been granted far more supernatural power than she should have been.  Through this, she was able to go on to become a superhero who is known for being sexually desirable as well as skilled in arcane magic.

Despite her deep-set hatred for blondes, Theresa had, before the events told in the series, entered in a relationship with the mute telepath Mindfuck, which she later broke off, blaming the failure on Mindfuck sharing hidden similarity to her psychopathic brother. However her later death in volume 5 left Theresa deeply traumatized, reduced in a barely functional mindset, capable of functioning normally only with external aid and assurance. It has also been revealed she is partially responsible for Emp's poor luck, having deliberately cast a spell that subconsciously urges supervillains into holding her teammate in bondage in an attempt to humiliate her "rival" (an act she has come to be horrified by upon realizing how traumatic this is to Emp).

As a further aggravant to her unbalanced mental state, Theresa is currently haunted by an implanted telepathic echo of Mindfuck herself, and pursued by the demon who accidentally gave her mystical powers. The demon claims to have taken Mindfuck's soul to Hell, where he subjects her to unspeakable horrors, and will continue to do so until Theresa breaks off their contract, renouncing her beauty and powers. Theresa currently teeters between accepting this second bargain or keeping her might.

Super Dawg

Super Dawg is a male, costumed, posthuman hero, and a nominal member of the Superhomeys superhero group.  Super dawg was shown ogling  Empowered as she walked past.  Super Dawg is shown to resemble an anthropomorphized British Bulldog in one instance, and a Pit Bull in another.  Additionally, he features the forepaws of a dog instead of humanoid hands.

Super Dawg's pseudonym is an eye dialect of "Super dog".

Syndablokk

Syndablokk is a posthuman male member of the Superhomeys superhero group.  Syndablokk's pseudonym is as such due to his head and hands appearing to be cinderblocks.  Despite this seeming physiological detriment, Syndablokk appears to be able to perform regular tasks that would normally require a certain degree of dexterousness of fingers, such as buckling his belt or putting on clothing. Additionally, like his colleague and fellow Superhomey, Protean, Syndablokk appears to have a full array of standard senses and is even able to communicate verbally, despite lacking all organs and structures that would normally facilitate this.  This may be due in part to Syndablokk’s ability to communicate with concrete, masonry, and pavement in a manner similar to psychometry, as well as animate these materials in a manner similar to telekinesis.  Despite having such a powerful and unique ability, he is rarely seen to use it because the effect of his powers tends to linger for a time after he has finished using it, and his powers inherently cause a large amount of collateral damage.

Unlike most of his colleagues, Syndablokk is kind to Emp and seems to sympathize with her.

Syndablokk is also commonly seen depicted in yaoi slash fan fiction manga with Major Havoc.  These stories are something of a guilty pleasure for Emp.

Syndablokk is an acquaintance of King Tyrant Lizard through their “Halycon days at the school”, which is implied to be a time before their transformations into their current posthuman biology.

Turbobrain

Turbobrain is a male cybernetic human member of the Superhomeys superhero group.  As indicated in his participation with the Superhomeys in attempting to ambush Willy Pete, Turbobrain is able to produce a telekinetic shield against fire.

Turbobrain is the "half" of the "One and a half" survivors of the ill-fated attempt to confront Willy Pete, the other revealed to be Major Havoc. During the Willy Pete assault, Turbobrain tried to shield both himself and Havoc from the fire, receiving horrific third degree burns on his whole body, but keeping Major Havoc relatively safe. Major Havoc later burns his arms by trying to drag away Turbobrain, and upon knowing of his full fate, keeps blaming Empowered for his current suffering

Yummy Mummy

Yummy Mummy is a supposedly mummified female member if the Superhomeys superhero group.  Yummy Mummy has not been shown in battle alongside the Superhomeys, nor has she had any meaningful part in any of the Empowered series, thus far.  The extent of her participation has been as a background character amongst the core members of the Superhomeys, and some commentary in issue six disapproving of another member's tastes in entertainment.

Villains

Anglerfish

Anglerfish is a posthuman supervillain whose head resembles the deep-ocean dwelling Anglerfish.  Anglerfish’s gender is assumed to be male despite his mouth containing the fang-like teeth only found in female Black Seadevils; the species of which Anglerfish most closely resembles.

Anglerfish’s bioluminescent lure, which he calls his “lurelight”, induces powerful hallucinations in those that observe it. These hallucinations may or may not be constructs of Anglerfish himself as individuals in large groups will be tricked into seeing whatever may be the most alluring to them, and he has also used his light in an attempt to placate Emp into not beating him up.

Anglerfish had a son known as Kid Anglerfish that was similar in appearance to Anglerfish; possessing a head that resembles an anglerfish and a lurelight that has hallucinogenic powers.

Baby Bird

Baby bird a being that resembles a large embryonic chick, and is part of a trio with two other costumed villains.  Its physical attributes regarding gender, race, and possible powers or abilities are not revealed, however, Baby Bird may possess human-like intelligence.  Also, as shown in an encounter with Willy Pete, Baby Bird’s flesh is resilient enough to withstand prolonged exposure to intense heat and fire.

Baby bird was sodomized to death and eaten by Willy Pete when the trio attempted to recruit Willy Pete into joining their villainous group on their way to assist the Felonifive on a planned assault of the pharmacy for the Purple Paladin Memorial Hospital.

Baron Womb

Baron Womb is a possible villain that was mentioned by Major Havoc as having extreme psychosis or an alternate personality that was able to confuse Mindfuck’s telepathic abilities.

Big Iron

Big Iron is a mechanical humanoid supervillain that threatened the city that is defended by the Superhomeys.  In his only appearance in the series, he became greatly offended when Emp was dispatched by the Superhomeys to deal with his attempt at ransoming the city with a large bomb.  Big Iron’s indignation at the appearance of Emp, implication that he was not a “Heavy Hitter”, was so great that he almost immediately abandoned his plot (and bomb).

Big Iron may take his name from the slang term for Cray supercomputers or high-gauge handguns.

Blunt Trauma

Blunt Trauma is a member of the “Apocalypse Clique” supervillain group.  Not much is known of Blunt Trauma other than, within the Empowered universe, his image is licensed for an action figure and that he is probably a supporter of the legalization of marijuana.

Blunt Trauma’s action figure depicts him as having a bare-skull head with oversized incisors on his lower jaw and a large marijuana cigar protruding from his mouth, and a ball mace in place of his right hand.

Blunt Trauma's pseudonym is a double entendre signified by his apparent use of marijuana and the medical term Blunt trauma, which refers to a type of physical trauma caused to a body part, either by impact, injury or physical attack.

Chloroformaster

Chloroformaster is a male costumed villain.  Since Chloroformaster, or “The Notorious CFM”, never actually causes bodily harm to those that he targets, he is considered amongst the superhero community to be more of a nuisance than an actual threat.  However, there is some contention between the female and male heroes over whether or not this is a fair designation; Sistah Spooky was very vocal over her assessments of CFM because she had been one of the many heroines that had been targeted.

Chloroformaster is essentially nothing more than a fetishist that prefers to target unsuspecting heroines, upon which he uses chloroform to render unconscious.  He then usually pleasures himself to the sight of their unconscious forms and later posts photos of them on his Internet blog.  Chloroformaster once rendered Major Havoc unconscious, but released him with a note asking him not to tell anybody that he had been captured as "...it just felt really gay."

Chloroformaster was defeated and captured by Emp when he accidentally fell asleep after pleasuring himself to her.

Chloroformaster's pseudonym is a noun-noun compound word composed of the words "Chloroform" and Master".

Crimera

Crimera is a supervillain that was shown in a short full-color chapter in the beginning of Volume 4 of the Empowered graphic novel series.  Crimera appears to be an armored, anthropomorphic lion that stands on its hind legs, with a goat head on the end of his right arm, and a fire-breathing dragon head on the end of his left. Crimera is possibly one of the more powerful villains faced by the Superhomeys, as dWARf!, Captain Rivet, and Major Havoc were shown to be defeated and left unconscious by Crimera.

Whatever Crimera’s power may be, he was quickly dealt with by Emp when she ran over him with an H3 Hummer.

Crimera’s name is a portmanteau of the words Crime and Chimera.

Crimson Camel

Crimson Camel is a villain that was mentioned briefly by Major Havoc along with Glue Gun Gil.  The Crimson Camel was mentioned as an example of a “scrub” villain who would be susceptible to the tactics recommended by Capitan Rivet.

Deathmonger

Deathmonger is a female supervillain who was not shown until Volume 6, despite being the center of a major conflict in Volume 1.  In this, Deathmonger mounted a major attack on City Hall with the assistance of her "Scythebots".   This plot was eventually foiled, but not without several civilian injuries and fatalities. However, her main superpower involves absolute control over the bargainers, dead superheroes who -- having received their powers from supernatural beings and goddesses -- are unable to truly die, but keep inhabiting their corpses, kept functional by their own powers. As such, before the main series event, she has amassed a huge army of bargainers, and upon fitting them with control devices (and harvesting their superpowered body parts when failing), planned to conquer the world. In her previous appearance, the SuperHomeys and Thugboy were enough only to halt her efforts; in her second-last appearance, with her undead army, her defeat requires Ninjette, Maid Man, Sistah Spooky and a contingent of free superdead, under the leadership of Empowered, who wielded Phallik's phallospear against the villain. She returned in volume 9, where she revealed her true gender (commenting that "everyone just assumed I was male").

Doomsloth

Doomsloth is a costumed male supervillain with a large retinue of uniformed henchpersons.  Doomsloth’s powers, if any, may have been afforded by the large helmet and three-clawed gauntlets that appear to be a part of his costume.

Doomsloth was never shown in action; only being captured by Protean and his henchmen forced into knocking themselves unconscious by Sistah Spooky.  Doomsloth’s motives for being a villain may be questionable, as he appeared to be more concerned over his reputation with other villains than having his plot foiled.

Glue Gun Gil

Glue Gun Gil is not actually seen in any conflict, but Empowered is seen bound and gagged in hardened thermoplastic adhesive, indicating that he had defeated her.  In assisting Emp in extricating herself from the adhesive, Sistah Spooky mentioned that Glue Gun Gil is one of the “lamest ‘villains’ to ‘terrorize’ the city”.  However, Glue Gun Gil may slightly outclass a pair of villains known as Ladder Master and The Pink Elephant. Glue Gun Gil is most likely a homage to the Marvel Comics supervillain Paste Pot Pete.

Hand Cholo

Hand Cholo is a posthuman/mutant member of the Felonifive supervillain group.  Hand Cholo derives his name from the fact that his hands are slightly larger than they should be, and his head is an oversized right hand. Rather than just being cosmetic, Hand Cholo’s hand/head is fully capable of articulated movement.  And, while the hand/head lacks the necessary organs to do so, Hand Cholo is able to speak and hear others; vision is not demonstrably shown.

Hand Cholo’s name may be an indication of him having a mixed heritage of Hispanic origin.  His name may also be word play of the name of the fictional Star Wars character “Han Solo”.

Icy Mike

Icy Mike is a male costumed supervillain that was briefly shown as one of the many villains that Thugboy had served as a henchperson for.  Icy Mike’s exploits seem to involve cryogenics and refrigeration technology.  He has also mentioned that he makes frequent use of his “cryogun“.

Like most of the supervillains that Thugboy has been a lackey for, Icy Mike was eventually subdued and had most of his technology stolen by Thugboy and the “Witless Minions”.  Thugboy’s given reason for eventually turning on Icy Mike was that he didn’t mind supporting villains that used the threat of mass-murder for monetary gain, but he would not allow Icy Mike to continue when he managed to produce a working “cryobomb” that could purportedly kill up to 50,000 civilians.

Idea Man

Idea Man is a male supervillain whose costume theme aimed to accentuate his ability to generate ideas for criminal plots.  One of these plot was to use the disembodied brain of a former telepathic villain named Psychoblast to “unleash an apocalypse”.  To this end, Idea Man, who knew of Psychoblast’s fetishes, had his henchpersons seek out a person who suitably met the criteria of a “sexy librarian”.  In order to track down and capture Idea Man, the Superhomeys set a trap in having Emp dress in an appropriate manner to lure Idea Man’s henchpersons into capturing her.

Judas Moose

Judas Moose is a possible supervillain.  Major Havoc mentioned Judas Moose as an example of an unusual or exotic mind that would fool Mindfuck’s perceptions.  Judas Moose may also have a “Kludge Mind”, similar to what Mindfuck thought that Willy Pete had.

Katastrophe

Katastrophe (German for "catastrophe" or "disaster") is a male costumed villain who was once a part of a trio with Kid Anglerfish and Baby Bird. Katastrophe wore a costume that appeared to include the skull of a Sabertoothed Tiger, worn as a helmet, as well as small replicas worn on the backs of his hands.

Similar to his former colleague, Baby Bird, Katastrophe’s only demonstrated superhuman ability is resilience against the intense heat generated by Willy Pete.  Also like Baby Bird, Katastrophe was cannibalized and sodomized by Willy Pete.

Kid Anglerfish

Kid Anglerfish is a male posthuman villain and member of a villainous trio with Baby Bird and Katastrophe. Like his father, Anglerfish, Kid Anglerfish’s head takes the appearance of a deep-ocean dwelling Anglerfish with teeth normally found in female Black Seadevils.  Also like his father, Kid Anglerfish has a hallucination inducing “lurelight”, something that his father has stated that he has only ever used to get sex.

Kid Anglerfish’s appearance is most likely genetic, because of his resemblance to his father.

Willy Pete implied that he caused Kid Anglerfish’s brain to explode due to a sudden, massive increase in temperature while he sodomized his eye sockets.

Killing Time

Killing Time, formerly known as Time2, is a male costumed villain that speaks in time-related puns and uses weaponry based on timepieces.  Killing Time does not have any actual powers and is shown to only be a threat if he manages to use one of his many hand-weapons, such as his "Chronoshillelagh" and “Chronobolo”.
Emp quickly defeated Killing Time when she “channeled” the elemental power of earth by smashing his head with a large rock.

King Tyrant Lizard

King Tyrant Lizard, or “KTL”, is a male posthuman supervillain and member of The Apocalypse Clique, who resembles a bipedal saurian.  King Tyrant Lizard derives his name for the English translation of the saurian species name Tyrannosaurus rex.  King Tyrant lizard possesses superhuman strength and is shown to have great resilience against blunt impacts as well as energy blasts.  As described by Syndablokk, before his transformation, King Tyrant Lizard was an angst-filled teenager named Jerome.  And even in his posthuman form, he is shown to have tantrums whenever people mock his sibilant lisp or damage the small crown he has chained to his head.

Ladder Master

Ladder Master is a villain mentioned by Sistah Spooky as possibly being even more lame, within the villainous milieu that terrorize the city, than Glue Gun Gil.

Laser Brain

Laser Brain is a male costumed villain and member of the Felonifive supervillain group.  Laser Brain’s powers, if any, are not shown or mentioned, but he is depicted as having a large, exposed brain that engulfs the top of his head, from the nose up. However, it is also possible that it is actually a stylized helmet, as it was shown being directly struck by Maid Man.

Lone Gunman

Lone Gunman is a male costumed villain that loosely themes himself as an outlaw of the American Old West.  He is most likely a low-priority villain amongst heroes, as he has a very laid-back attitude and cocksure manner, even while committing robberies.  Lone Gunman was not demonstrated to have any special abilities or attributes, but he does use a large caliber handgun in confrontations with assailing heroes.

Ultimately, his disdain for the law and utter disrespect for Emp’s abilities as a hero were his downfall.

Manny

Manny was a male 11-year-old cancer patient at the Purple Paladin Memorial hospital. Manny had been diagnosed with a terminal case of leukemia, which would deny him his dream of growing up to become a supervillain.  So, through the assistance of the Grant-A-Wish program, and some coercion from Sistah Spooky, Emp was convinced to meet Manny and assist in granting his wish to experience the capture of a superhero.

Soon after his experience in “capturing” Emp, Manny worked up the courage to somehow bypass the security of the pharmacy for the Purple Paladin Memorial hospital and steal a dose of an extraterrestrial carcinogen known as “Mayfly”.  After ingesting the Mayfly, and receiving the subsequent cerebral growth caused by a multitude of carcinogenic brain tumors that the drug causes, Manny built a Powered exoskeleton out of purloined hospital equipment and went missing.

Later, in the aftermath of the sabotaged Caped Justice awards, Manny sent an army of robots that he had constructed, and abducted dWARf! so that he might devise a treatment for his terminal condition.

Neurospear

Also known by his original alias of Brainbow, Neurospear was Mindfuck's younger brother. Originally a shy, nervous boy and pacifist, his telepathic powers forced him to constantly listen to the darker emotions and anxieties of other people. After being forced by other superheroes to create Willy Pete as an artificial container for several alien superpowers, Neurospear became convinced the only way to overcome his anxieties was to destroy his capacity to feel empathy or doubt, becoming a sociopathic terrorist unable to consider the ethical quandaries of his actions and obsessed with putting other superheroes through trauma in order to improve their abilities and willpower. 

He escapes from cryogenic prison before the end of Volume 10 and possesses ThugBoy, Ninjette, and most of the Superhomies with his telepathic abilities as an army to use against Emp in a "trial" of both her abilities and out of anger at Mindfuck's death, with the battle against him being the focus of Volume 11. He is defeated when Emp, working off information given to her by a remnant of Mindfuck's mind and with the assistance of Sistah Spooky, tricks him into attempting to seize control of her mind, allowing the remnant to stun Neurospear and kill him.

The Pink Elephant

The Pink Elephant is a villain that was mentioned, along with Ladder Master, as being even more pathetic than Glue Gun Gil.

Quasarmodo

Quasarmodo is a minor male supervillain who was briefly shown participating in an instructional video alongside Ocelotina.  Through his participation in said video, and his status as an actual, if inept, villain, Ocelotina’s validity as a “wannabe“ costumed hero is brought into question.

Quasarmodo’s name is a portmanteau of “Quasar” and “Quasimodo”.

Rum, Sodomy, and the Lash

Rum, Sodomy, and the Lash, was originally a trio of villains that had themed themselves in dress and affectation of speech after British naval culture. After the man calling himself Rum was sent to court-ordered AA meetings for his many DUIs and the man calling himself Sodomy became fed up with constantly trying to explain that he strictly represented heterosexual sodomy gave up and left the group, The Lash took on their names and tried to continue in the same vein of context.

In time spent in this villainous persona, Rum, Sodomy, and the Lash affects a comically heavy British accent, is seen drinking rum from a bottle, and battles with a bullwhip.

In an encounter with Emp, Rum, Sodomy, and the Lash was proficient enough with the bullwhip to capture and throw Emp through the plate glass window of a fabric store.  However, due to his phobia or hatred of fabric stores, an issue that was developed in his childhood when his mother would take him to shop at fabric stores for hours on end, RSL gave up the chase and conceded a shallow victory to Emp.

Rum, Sodomy, and the Lash takes his name from a quote concerning naval tradition, made by former British Prime Minister Winston Churchill.

Spartan 3000

Spartan 3000 is one of the many costumed villains that Thugboy has served under as a henchman.  Spartan 3000 has never been shown, but is notable within the milieu of villains for the level of detail in his Spartan warrior-themed henchmen’s costume uniforms. For Emp, Thugboy’s Spartan 3000 costume is very arousing and something of a fetish; much like how Emp's Sexy Librarian costume is for Thugboy.

Like most villains that Thugboy had worked under, Spartan 3000 was eventually driven into bankruptcy by the underhanded dealing of the Witless Minions.

Super Caucasian

Super Caucasian is a supervillain briefly mentioned in Volume 1.  Super Caucasian is supposedly a white supremacist that will only hire henchpersons if they are sufficiently Caucasoid.  Thugboy briefly worked for Super Caucasian but was fired when his sunglasses were knocked off and revealed his eyes to be epicanthic in appearance; a common trait in people from East Asian countries.

Weird Beard

Weird Beard is a male costumed supervillain and member of the Felonifive supervillain group.  Weird Beard calls himself as such because of his long, flowing beard that is able to move and interact with objects like an extra appendage.  The nature of his beard’s movement is not known, but the power-nullifying field of Wet Blanket equally affects it.

Maid Man captured Weird Beard, along with the rest of the Felonifive, by infiltrating the group as the villainous doppelganger "Crowquet".

Wet Blanket

Wet Blanket is a male costumed villain and member of the Felonifive supervillain group.  Wet Blanket is unusual in the world of superhumans in that he passively exudes an aura that nullifies all forms and types of superhuman abilities in those around him.  This field effect has an effective radius of approximately 25 feet.  Additionally, the field is generated by every cell in his body, and appears to not be affected by cellular metabolism.  This was demonstrated when Wet Blanket’s flesh was used to taint the catered food served at the Caped Justice Awards ceremony, thus de-powering the majority of the heroes in attendance.  The only heroes to have retained their effectiveness despite having eaten the power-nullifying flesh of Wet Blanket were those that did not have powers to begin with and those whose abilities stemmed from technology.

In addition to his power nullifying abilities Wet Blanket is generally an annoying person (and hence a "wet blanket" at any gathering) because he tries to impress his politically correct viewpoints on others.  In this, he is shown commenting on the lack of diversity in the henchmen that are hired by the Felonifive, trying to convince the other villains of the group to switch to energy saving Incandescent lightbulbs, and renting An Inconvenient Truth instead of the horror movies that his colleagues had wanted to see.

The fate of Wet Blanket is unknown.  In volume 4, it is shown that dWARf! had abducted Wet Blanket and removed at least 12 lbs. of flesh from him in order to sabotage the upcoming Caped Justice awards.  However, Wet Blanket is not indicated to have survived or perished as a result.

Wet Blanket's powers are very similar to those of Leech in the Marvel Universe.

Willy Pete

Willy Pete takes his name from the military jargon term for white phosphorus.  It is presumed that he does so because he is -- as he has termed himself -- a “Fire Elemental”.  Whatever his origin, he appears to be a mass of self-sustaining plasma that takes the form of a bearded nude man.  Thus far, Willy Pete’s true nature is not clearly revealed beyond assumptions about himself.

Willy Pete is a horrendously degenerate being whose primary focus in existence has been to find beings, of any gender, with enough resilience to withstand his intense heat so that he may have forced intercourse or sodomize them in their various orifices.

While under normal conditions, Willy Pete only produces temperatures in the hundreds to thousands of degrees; it was shown that he is capable of outputting fusion-level temperatures in the 6-digit range.  Something that he did, which subsequently caused the Joint Superhero Space Station 3, colloquially known as the “D10”, to lose its orbit of Earth and disintegrate in the atmosphere.

It is gradually revealed that Willy Pete was never human, but a "kludge mind", a psychokinetic construct used to hold a group of alien superpowers made by Neurospear as a weapon against an unknown threat, an act which led indirectly to Neurospear's madness. He is killed when Neurospear attempts to take control of him, but Willy Pete fights off his influence, forcing Neurospear to unmake his creation.

Other characters

The Caged Demonwolf
"The Caged Demonwolf" is a multidimensional being of pure energy that resides atop Emp's coffee table within the power-draining bondage gear the Imperial Pimpotron had used to capture her.  The origin and attributes of The Caged Demonwolf are something of a mystery in that he appears to be a being of pure energy, who requires a physical host in order to inhabit the three-dimensional material plane.  The Caged Demonwolf often predicts events before they occur and speaks of things he was not around to experience, however, he has been shown to give illuminations of what he believes Emp and Thugboy's sexual escapades to be like, and this may indicate that he simply likes to use his imagination.

Although he is most commonly known as "The Caged Demonwolf", he has been known to refer to himself in other ways.  And, because of his alliterative wordiness and tendencies to speak in the third person (even if he can speak in a normal fashion when he chooses to do so), it is somewhat difficult to know if he has one specific name, or possibly none at all.  So far, he has also been referred to as:

1.He Whose Name is too Scary to be Spoken
2.The Advice-Administering Autarch
3.The All-Knowing Hellspawn
4.The All-Seeing Autocrat
5.The All-Seeing Overlord
6.The Blazing Devilgoat
7.The Blazing-Eyed, but Prudent, Demonlord
8.The Blazing-Eyed Demonwolf
9.The Blazing-Eyed Devilgoat
10.The Caged Demonwolf
11.The Cataclysmic Snuffer of Civilizations
12.The Cosmic Cognoscente
13.The Dark Godling
14.The Darkling Demigod
15.The Darkling Demiurge
16.The Debauched Devilgoat
17.The Demonlord
18.The Diabolic Dybbuk
19.The Dissolutely Depraved Demigodling
20.The Eldritch 12-Cylinder Engine of Destruction
21.The Eldritch Yarnspinner
22.The Eavesdropping Erlking
23.The Fusion-Phallused Molestor of Worlds
24.The Fusion-Phallused Violator of Worlds
25.The Galactic Ghoul
26.The Immoral Immortal
27.The Immortal, and Immoral, Starspawn
28.The Immortal Demongoat
29.The Immortal Starbeast
30.The Immortal Starspawn
31.The Keen-Eared Kingfiend
32.The Malevolent Mythpoet
33.The Merciless Master of Chaos
34.The Merciless Monarch
35.The Nigh-Omniscient Arch-Fiend
36.The Nigh-Omniscient Demongoat

37.The Nigh-Omniscient Netherlord
38.The Nigh-Omniscient Nycadaemon
39.The Nigh-Omniscient Overlord
40.The Omniscient Overlord
41.The Omni-Observational Overlord
42.The Prurient Potentate
43.The Ravening Hellbeast
44.The Ravening Shadowking
45.The Ravening Shadowlord
46.The Sagacious Savant
47.The Sagacious Storyteller
48.The Scourge of the Spaceways
49.The Sensual Sovereign
50.The Shadowscourge of the Spaceways
51.The Silver-Tongued Sovereign
52.The Sinful Sovereign
53.The Sinister Savant
54.The Sinister Snuffer of Civilizations
55.The Sin-Sensing Celestial
56.The Snuffer of Civilizations
57.The Spacefaring Satyr
58.The Spacefaring Sensual Sovereign
59.The Spacefaring Shadowking
60.The Spacefaring Suzerain
61.The Star-Striding Savant
62.The Storytelling Sovereign
63.The Storytelling Suzerain
64.The Sulfurous Straight-Talker
65.The Tale-Telling Titangoat
66.The Terrifying Troubadour
67.The Titanic Taleteller
68.The Titanic Tyrant
69.The Transcendent Tyrant
70.The Truth Telling Titan
71.The Violator of Worlds
72.The World Snuffer

The Caged Demonwolf admits that "...he was not popular with the other Ancient Ones... ...their term for him would translate to geek."

Although The Caged Demonwolf was first shown as a marauding antagonist, he has become more of a friend and narrator to the reader of the book.  As the series has progressed, The Caged Demonwolf becomes more accepting of his situation and more amicable to Emp, Thugboy, and Ninjette, even confessing to a drunk Ninjette that due to his immortality he will regret surviving his new friends. The Caged Demonwolf is also shown to be on good speaking terms with Emp's mother, who (as the conversations are over the telephone in Emp's suit) is presumably unaware of his origins.

Ayakami-Clan ninja
The Ayakami Clan ninja are a group that have been contracted by the Kaburagi clan to capture and return the ninja-princess, Ninjette (also known as Kozue Kaburagi), to her clan.  The Ayakami clan is apparently well studied in a form of ninjutsu that allows them to suppress extreme pain.  This skill was greatly demonstrated during their attempt to capture Ninjette in a park.

Unlike other ninjas thus far shown within the Empowered series, those of the Ayakami clan almost constantly conceal their faces behind Noh masks. This is something that they have been shown to do even without the presence of others, although, they were shown without the masks for a brief period before attempting to trap Ninjette.

By the end of volume 3 of the Empowered series, numerous Ayakami clan ninja were all killed in their attempt to capture Ninjete, mainly because of timely assistance from Emp and Thugboy. Thugboy himself was seen shooting their bodies to finish them off. Volume 7 focuses on the remainder of their forces attempting to capture Ninjette, only to be defeated by the combined force of the ninja princess and Oyuki. Oyuki noted to herself that Ninjette's victory over the Ayakami would only reinforce her own clan's efforts to capture her.

Nurse Foxtrot & Nurse Whiskey

Nurses Foxtrot and Whiskey are two medical assistants seen alongside Dr. Big McLarge Huge.  Foxtrot and Whiskey are very similar in appearance as well as appear to be examples of perfect or idealized human physiology.  Their physical condition is indicated to not be coincidental.  Something which is further exemplified by the appearances of the other female and male nurses of the Suprahuman wing of the Purple Paladin Memorial Hospital. Additionally, the nurse uniforms of the Suprahuman treatment wing appear to be designed to draw attention to the physical perfection of the nurses.

Whatever may be the impetus behind the nurses' appearances, it is most likely artificially induced, as some of the nurses in attendance of the Caped Justice Awards were shown to revert to a less-than-ideal physiology when they became affected by the tainted catered food.

Nurse Whiskey and Nurse Foxtrot are named for the letters W and F in the NATO Phonetic Alphabet, respectively.

Oyuki-chan

Oyuki-chan is a female ninja of the New Jersey-based Kaburagi ninja clan. Oyuki-chan expresses open contempt towards Ninjette because of her abandonment of the clan, but is somehow indebted to her; her animosity (and simultaneous indebtedness) seems mostly due to Ninjette using a permanent anti-pregnancy jutsu on her when they were younger, at Oyuki's request, which she may now as an adult severely regret.

Like Ninjette, Oyuki-chan is a practitioner of ninjutsu. Particularly, a disguise ability that allowed her to perfectly mimic Thugboy in appearance. However, this illusion was imperfect, as Ninjette was able to detect the deception because Oyuki did not smell like Thugboy. Oyuki-chan refers to herself only in the third person, and her speech is both extremely formal and extremely profane.

Imperial Pimpotron Alpha

Imperial Pimpotron Alpha is an extraterrestrial autonomous robot that abducts female alien specimens to serve in an intergalactic harem for an unnamed "Cosmic Emperor". In Imperial Pimpotron Alpha's only appearance in the series, it captured Emp with power-draining mechanical bondage gear as a preamble to "testing" Emp's body to see if she fit within specifications for harem duty.

Fortunately for Emp, Imperial Pimpotron Alpha determined that her buttocks were too ample and that meant she was not fit for abduction into the intergalactic harem. However, as fortunate as she may have been in not being taken, Imperial Pimpotron Alpha's implication that her buttocks were too large still saddened Emp.

Imperial Pimpotron Alpha was extremely wordy and spoke in a comical manner, using inappropriate compound words that have relatively obvious implied meaning:

"Tremblejiggle as the legendary Imperial Cosmichains drain away all your super-powertude, nubile femmeling! But, you should tremblejiggle with pride, young mammalette... For you are being deeply honorified!  For I, Imperial Pimpotron Alpha, am Scouticruiting you for priviligious erotiservitude to the Cosmolactic Emperor's harem!"

It may be possible that Imperial Pimpotron Alpha's speech patterns are normal for the society that created him, as even the instrument he used to gauge Emp spoke with the same affectations:

"Analysizing Complete! Subject's Oralitudity is confirmated as suffiquately succuluscious for harem duty."

Despite Imperial Pimpotron Alpha's initial certainty that Emp would be acceptable for harem duties, she was summarily rejected when she was found to be too steatopygious for the Emperor's tastes.

References

Lists of Dark Horse Comics characters